Parikkala is a municipality of Finland located in the province of Southern Finland and is part of the South Karelia region,  from Lappeenranta and  from Joensuu.

Parikkala is located around lake Simpele and it is a part of a countryside rich with hills and chains of ridges. The municipality is unilingually Finnish.

History

Settlements and artifacts dated to the Stone Age and Bronze Age have been found in Parikkala. A permanent settlement was established around the 15th century.

Many demarcations had a significant impact to Parikkala's development from the Treaty of Nöteborg on August 12, 1323 to peace treaties signed in 1947 with the Soviet Union; for example, in the Treaty of Nystad from 1721, which in practice defined roughly Finland's current border with Russia, Parikkala remained the only current Finnish municipality on the Russian side before the formation of the Grand Duchy of Finland. After World War II, one third (199.3 km²) of Parikkala's area was handed over to the Soviet Union. The Orthodox Church has been very influential in this area since the middle ages. Later, Parikkala has become known for its many dairies.  Parikkala became independent in 1617.

In 2004, three municipalities (Parikkala, Saari and Uukuniemi) merged to form one municipality called Parikkala.

Education
A comprehensive school, one of the first rural schools in Karelia of Ladoga, was founded in 1907. In 1910 the first three-class school building was built; later it expanded to include a gymnasium, hall and kitchen. A grand piano was provided in the hall, and Finnish artists Toivo Kuula and Oskar Merikanto held their concerts there when visiting Parikkala. Upper secondary school started in the year 1940 and the first class graduated in 1943. The largest number of pupils was in the 1950s, when over 500 pupils attended school there.

Traveling and routes
Parikkala is located on the main railway line from Helsinki to Joensuu. A railway station is located in the middle of Parikkala village center. Traveling time is about three and half hours from Helsinki, and all passenger trains stop at Parikkala. The city of Imatra is about 60 km south of Parikkala.

Notable people

See also
 Niukkala – village in Parikkala

References

External links

Municipality of Parikkala
Beaches
goSaimaa.com – travel information
Siikalahti Wetland
Parikkalan Urheilijat – Athletes Club
Business Owners of Parikkala

 
Populated places established in 1635
1635 establishments in Sweden